Phonetically Based Phonology is a 2004 book edited by Bruce Hayes, Robert Kirchner, and Donca Steriade in which the authors discuss a theory based on which phonologies are determined by phonetic principles.

Reception
The book was reviewed by Keiichi Tajima, Jennifer L. Smith and Marc van Oostendorp.

References 

2004 non-fiction books
Phonology books
Edited volumes
Cambridge University Press books
Phonetics books